Torque pharmaceuticals is an Indian pharmaceutical company with production units at Issapur, Derabassi in Punjab and at Jharmajri, Baddi in Himachal Pradesh. It manufactures medicines for prevention and treatment of various health related problems. The product range comprises antibiotics, nutritional supplements and cough syrup to antipyretics and anti-inflammatory products.

History
Torque Pharmaceuticals was started as a partnership concern in August 1985 with a small investment of 240,000 INR (US$18000). It started with the production of oral liquids with tablet manufacture starting in 1987. In 1991, after the acquisition of Mac Brown, the manufacture of small volume parenterals and export to Uganda was commenced. A manufacturing unit was set up at Derabassi, Himachal Pradesh in 1994 and the company was named as Torque Pharmaceuticals Pvt. Ltd., which started the manufacture of parenterals in 2002. In the same year export to Mozambique and Angola were started. A WHO-GMP Compliance Certificate was awarded by the Drug Regulatory Authorities in the year 2005, as was ISO 9001-2000 certification. The National Drugs Authority (NDA), Uganda certified TORQUE for export of medicines. Another unit was added in Baddi, Himachal Pradesh in 2006.

Under the campaign to promote Torex Cough Syrup, renowned singer Jagjit Singh was chosen as its ambassador in 2007. The next year the company was inspected by Pharmacy and Poisons Board Kenya and subsequently approved. The existing facilities were further expanded in 2010 with acquisition of 200,000 sq. ft. of constructed area in Baddi. More products were launched under the brand name; Ketomac shampoo and No Scars. Next year, other brands were acquired from Ochoa Labs, such as Canstat, Terbofin and Zincoa. Personal care segment was started with introduction of Ketomac Hair Oil in 2012. A year later, the traditional distribution system of its logistical network was changed to DTS. At present, increase in sales volume is being stressed.

Products
The product range includes Capsule (pharmacy), dry syrups, Injection (medicine), ear drops and eye drops, external preparations (topical medication), oral liquids (Liquid solution or suspension) and Tablet (pharmacy). A range of personal care products such as hair oil and sun screens (sunscreen) are also available.

Founders
The company was launched as a partnership venture with P.S. Chhatwal and A.I.S. Bedi in 1985. Mr.Chhatwal has 36 years of experience in the pharma industry and is a senior member of Himachal Drug Manufacturers Association. Mr. A.I.S. Bedi brings with him the advantage of a science and pharmaceutical background.

Facilities
The company has three units; one in Derabassi and two in Baddi. The unit at Issapur, near Derabassi, Punjab covers an area of almost 1,50,000 sq. ft. and is an export oriented unit with automated machinery and equipment. The unit at Jharmajri, Baddi, Solan is spread over an area of almost 90,000 sq. ft. and caters mostly to the domestic market. Another 40 acres of land have been acquired to set up a textile unit. A textile unit which produces spinning yarn is located here with a capacity of almost 8000 spindles.

Recognition
Torque has been awarded NSIC-CRISIL SE1B credit rating for ‘Highest Performance Capability & Moderate Financial Strength’, NDA (Uganda) Certification, Certification from Pharmacy & Poisons Board (Kenya) and is a member of Basic Chemicals, Pharmaceuticals & Cosmetics Export Promotion Council (CHEMEXCIL), Delhi Chamber of Commerce, Pharmexil and Pharmabiz.

References

External links
 

Pharmaceutical companies established in 1985
Pharmaceutical companies of India
Generic drug manufacturers
Companies based in Punjab, India
Indian brands
1985 establishments in Punjab, India
Indian companies established in 1985